NPMD may refer to:
Non-psychotic major depressive disorder, in order to distinguish this condition from psychotic major depression (PMD)
North Papuan Mainland–D'Entrecasteaux languages, a putative group of Papuan Tip languages
Network Performance Monitoring & Diagnostics